Francis Gentleman (23 October 1728 - 21 December 1784) was an Irish actor, poet, and dramatic writer of 18th century. He wrote several plays, dramatic works, poems and edited Shakspeare's plays for the stage.

Biography

Born at York St., Dublin, Ireland,  on October 23, 1728. He received his education in Dublin and served in army till dismissed in 1748. Later, he indulged his inclination for the stage appearing in Dublin, London, Edinburgh, and many more. He first appeared in Thomas Southerne's stage play Oroonoko – in the character of Aboan. He started his career of writing for the stage in England, notably, tragic works like Sejanus and The Sultan of Love and Fame; and comedies like The Modish Wife and The Tobacconist. He died at the age of 56 on 21 December 1784.

Selected works 

 Sejanus (1751)
 A Trip to the Moon (1765)
 The Sultan of Love and Fame (1770)
 The Modish Wife (1773)
 The Dramatic Censor (1770)
 The Censor (1770)
 Tobacconist (1771)

References

External links
Francis Gentleman , 1812 Chalmers Biography at Words From Old Books
Francis Gentleman, 1878 Compendium of Irish Biography, at Library Ireland
 
 

1728 births
1784 deaths
Irish male poets
18th-century Irish poets
Irish male dramatists and playwrights
18th-century Irish dramatists and playwrights
18th-century Irish male writers
Irish male stage actors
18th-century Irish male actors
Male actors from Dublin (city)
Irish emigrants to Great Britain